Santa Elena is a municipality in the Honduran department of La Paz.

Demographics
At the time of the 2013 Honduras census, Santa Elena municipality had a population of 12,162. Of these, 92.06% were Indigenous (92.02% Lenca), 7.79% Mestizo, 0.11% Black or Afro-Honduran, 0.01% White and 0.02% others.

References

Municipalities of the La Paz Department (Honduras)